Pamiria is a Palearctic genus of butterflies in the family Lycaenidae.

Species
Listed alphabetically:

 Pamiria chitralensis (Tytler, 1926) Kashmir
 Pamiria chrysopis (Grum-Grshimailo, 1888) Hindu Kush, Pamirs
 Pamiria farazi (Pagès & Charmeux, 1997) Pakistan
 Pamiria galathea (Blanchard, [1844]) Himalaya
 Pamiria issa Zhdanko, 1995 Hindu Kush
 Pamiria margo Zhdanko, 2002
 Pamiria metallica (C. & R. Felder, [1865]) Himalaya
 Pamiria omphisa (Moore, [1875]) Himalaya, North China
 Pamiria selma (Koçak, 1996) Himalaya

References

External links

Polyommatini
Lycaenidae genera